Paul John Holmes (born 25 August 1988) is a British Conservative Party politician serving as Member of Parliament (MP) for Eastleigh since 2019.

Early life 

Holmes was born at Guy's Hospital in Southwark, London, on 25 August 1988, to John Edward Holmes and Sandra Holmes. He grew up on the Bellingham council estate in Lewisham.

Holmes attended Elfrida Primary School in Bellingham and Kelsey Park Sports College in Beckenham.

Career 

While a second-year student of Politics and International Relations at the University of Southampton, Holmes was elected as a Conservative councillor in the 2008 Southampton City Council election, representing the Redbridge ward, a seat he gained from the Labour Party. He served on Southampton City Council as Chair of the Planning Committee and Cabinet Member for Education and Social Services. Holmes stood down at the 2012 council election.

Holmes worked as a parliamentary researcher to Wimbledon MP Stephen Hammond from 2011 to 2015. From 2015 to 2016, he was an account manager at Portland Communications.

He unsuccessfully contested Mitcham and Morden, a safe seat for the Labour Party, at the 2015 general election, and the more marginal Labour-held Southampton Test at the 2017 general election.

He worked as a special adviser (SpAd) to Conservative Party Chairman and Chancellor of the Duchy of Lancaster Patrick McLoughlin between 2016 and 2017, before becoming Special Adviser to Damian Green, the first secretary of state and minister for the Cabinet Office. Holmes remained in this role until Green's resignation from Government. He then worked as SpAd to the secretary of state for education, Damian Hinds, in 2018, and became head of public affairs at Clarion Housing Group in the same year.

Holmes was elected to Parliament in 2019, succeeding Conservative Mims Davies, who had stood down as MP for Eastleigh before later being selected to represent Mid Sussex. He was elected to serve on the Housing, Communities and Local Government Select Committee until January 2021, and the Select Committee on Statutory Instruments, which he continues to serve on. 

In January 2021, he was appointed as Parliamentary Private Secretary to the Home Office ministerial team. On 20 September 2021, Holmes was promoted to PPS to the home secretary Priti Patel. He resigned from this position on 27 May 2022, over concerns around "toxic culture" at the heart of Government following the publication of the Sue Gray report.

Holmes was appointed Vice Chairman of the Conservative Party with responsibility for policy in November 2022 following Rishi Sunak forming a Government.

Personal life
Holmes currently lives in Hedge End. He lists his recreations as "real ale, cooking, aviation", and is a member of the Southern Parishes Conservative club.

References

External links

1988 births
Living people
Conservative Party (UK) MPs for English constituencies
UK MPs 2019–present
Councillors in Hampshire
Alumni of the University of Southampton
LGBT members of the Parliament of the United Kingdom
English LGBT politicians
Gay politicians
People from the Borough of Eastleigh